The 2006 Maryland Senate elections were held on November 7, 2006, as part of the 2006 United States elections, including the 2006 Maryland gubernatorial election. All 47 of Maryland's state senators were up for reelection. Neither party netted seats, allowing Democrats to retain supermajority control of the chamber.

References

2006
Senate
Maryland General Assembly